Sergei Prokofiev composed his Divertissement Op.43 for small orchestra. The work is closely related to his ballet, Trapèze. He also made a piano transcription of the work with subtitles for each movement.

Background 
Prokofiev wrote a ballet Trapèze on a theme of circus for the touring company Boris Romanov. Trapèze was written for quintet to suit the small instrumental section of the company. In 1929, he adapted movements from the ballet as the first and third movements, combining them with the second movement which he had sketched the previous year and the finale originally composed for another ballet Prodigal Son, to form a complete divertimento. Much of the score for Trapèze was adapted in his Quintet Op. 39.

He transcribed Divertissement for piano solo, which was a fairy literal adaption of the orchestral version. He supplied subtitles for movements of divertimento for piano whereas the orchestral version used only tempo markings.

Structure
The divertimento consists of four movements, which last for about 15 minutes to perform. Subtitles of movements for the piano transcription are shown with quotation marks.

 Moderato, molto ritmato, "Divertissement"
 Larghetto (non troppo lento), "Nocturne" 
 Allegro energico, "Danse"
 Allegro non troppo e pesante, "Epilogue"

The subject in the first movement reappears in the finale.

Notes

References
 Booklet for CD, Noël Goodwin, Prokofiev: The Prodigal Son Op.46, Chandos, CHAN 8728

External links
 
 
 

Compositions by Sergei Prokofiev
1929 compositions